I'm Comin' Over is the fifth studio album by American country music artist Chris Young.  It was released on November 13, 2015 via RCA Nashville.  The lead single, the title track, was released to radio on May 11, 2015. The track listing was revealed on October 14. Young co-wrote nine of the album's eleven tracks. The album's three singles all reached No. 1 on the Country Airplay chart.

Reception

Critical
AllMusic's Stephen Thomas Erlewine found the overall vibe of the album to be "warm and slow", and that the strength of the album is "its mellow assurance, to which Young adds a shade of gravity with his gravelly voice, a touch of down-home flair that never seems affected". He gave the album four out of five stars, calling it the strongest of his career so far. In 2017, Billboard contributor Chuck Dauphin placed three tracks from the album on his top 10 list of Young's best songs: "Think of You" at number six, "Sober Saturday Night" at number eight and the title track at number ten.

Commercial
The album debuted at No. 1 on the Billboard Top Country Albums, the first No. 1 for Chris Young on the chart. It also debuted at No. 5 on the Billboard 200, with 57,000 copies sold (65,000 equivalent album units) in the US It sold a further 19,000 copies in its second week.  The album has sold 271,000 copies in the US as of May 2017.

Track listing

Personnel
 Nick Autry — engineer 
 Dave Cohen — organ, piano, synthesizer 
 Terry Crisp — steel guitar 
 Corey Crowder — acoustic guitar, programming 
 Billy Decker — mixing 
 Vince Gill — electric guitar and background vocals on "Sober Saturday Night" 
 Casey Henderson — production assistant 
 Wes Hightower — background vocals 
 Kam Luchterhand — production assistant 
 Tony Lucido — bass guitar 
 Alyson McAnally — production coordinator 
 Miles McPherson — drums, percussion
 Carl Miner — banjo, bouzouki, acoustic guitar, mandolin 
 Cassadee Pope — duet vocals on "Think of You" 
 Matt Rausch — engineer 
 Kristen Rogers — background vocals on "I Know a Guy" 
 Jonathan Singleton — background vocals on "Callin' My Name" 
 Bill Warren — production assistant 
 Derek Wells — electric guitar 
 Hank Williams — mastering 
 Chris Young — lead vocals, producer

Chart performance

Album

Weekly charts

Year-end charts

Certifications

References

2015 albums
Chris Young (musician) albums
RCA Records albums